Dalian Institute of Science and Technology, is a four-year engineering college, located in Lüshunkou District, Dalian City, Liaoning Province, China.

General
It has its origin in the Information Technology Department, established in 2002, of Dalian Jiaotong University, and became in 2003 an independent school owned by both Jiaotong University and Dalian Sunshine Century Group.  It was renamed in 2011 as Dalian Institute of Science and Technology.

Departments
It has now various departments, such as mechanical engineering, electrical engineering, information technology, software technology, foreign languages (English and Japanese) and fine arts. The International Cooperation and Exchange College has close tie with Wright State University, Ohio, U.S., and other colleges overseas.

Address
Address: 999-26 Binggang Road, Lüshun Economic and Development Zone, Dalian City 
Phone: 0411-8624-5011

See also
  Dalian Jiaotong University

References

External links
 Official site  (in Chinese)

Universities and colleges in Dalian
Educational institutions established in 2002
2002 establishments in China